Dave Davis (born David Glenn Davis) is a former wide receiver in the National Football League. Davis was drafted by the Green Bay Packers in the seventh round of the 1971 NFL Draft and played two seasons with the team. He later played with the Pittsburgh Steelers and the New Orleans Saints.

References

1948 births
Living people
People from Alcoa, Tennessee
Green Bay Packers players
Pittsburgh Steelers players
New Orleans Saints players
American football wide receivers
Tennessee State Tigers football players